Dario Dester (born 22 July 2000) is an Italian decathlete, current national record holder of the decathlon outdoor and heptathlon indoor.

Career
On August 16, 2022, at the Munich 2022 European Championships he beat the decathlon Italian record of Beniamino Poserina which had stood for 26 years.

Statistics

National records
 Heptathlon: 6076 pts (Ancona, 21 February 2021) - Current holder
 60 m: 7.02 / 875, long jump: 7.66 / 975, shot put: 14.03 / 730, high jump: 2.01 / 813;
 60 m hs: 8.13 / 949, pole vault: 5.00 / 910, 1000 m: 2:44.53 / 824.
 Decathlon: 8218 pts (Munich, 16 August 2022) - Current holder

Personal bests
 Decathlon: 8218 pts (Munich, 16 August 2022)

By event

Achievements

National titles
Dester has won four national championship at individual senior level.

 Italian Athletics Championships
 Decathlon: 2020, 2022
 Italian Athletics Indoor Championships
 Heptathlon: 2021, 2022

See also
 Italian records in athletics
 Italian all-time lists - Decathlon

References

External links

2000 births
Living people
Italian decathletes
Athletics competitors of Centro Sportivo Carabinieri
Sportspeople from the Province of Brescia
Italian Athletics Championships winners